General elections were held in Costa Rica on 4 February 1990. Rafael Ángel Calderón Fournier of the Social Christian Unity Party (PUSC) won the presidential election, whilst his party also won the parliamentary election. Voter turnout was 81.8%.

Unlike previous elections, Calderon's nomination was not undisputed. Despite expressing that he would not run again for President after the results of the previous race, he was eventually convinced by his followers. Yet, young former minister and business man Miguel Ángel Rodríguez Echeverría from the liberal faction inside PUSC choose to face Calderón at the primaries. Former deputy José Hine from PUSC's left wing also run with testimonial results.

Despite the fact that Rodríguez clearly had no chance against Calderón, his candidacy was considered a smart move, as he would start to be in the spotlight and helping his way in future nominations. As expected, Calderón won the primary election with 75% of the votes. On the other sidewalk former vice president Carlos Manuel Castillo won over young minister Rolando Araya Monge (nephew of ex-president Luis Alberto Monge) in PLN's primaries after a very hostile and traumatic campaign, in which Castillo even accused Araya of links with Narcotraffic, something that weakened PLN. Minor parties proliferated in this election, with up to 12 different parties taking part, of which only left-wing coalition United People having some relevance with sociologist Victor Daniel Camacho as nominee earning 3% of the votes.

Results

President

By province

Parliament

By province

Local governments

Ballot

References

1990 elections in Central America
1990 in Costa Rica
Elections in Costa Rica